NBA Stories is a show where it features the stories about the NBA teams, players, and coaches.

Stars/teams episodes

 Phoenix Suns
 Toronto Raptors
 Steve Nash
 Gilbert Arenas
 Dirk Nowitzki
 Mike D'Antoni
 Hakeem Olajuwon
 Dwight Howard
 Stephen Curry
 James Harden

Old edition
 The old edition was aired on 1992 to 1994 as NBA on NBC other programs which was hosted  by various NBA on NBC contributors. Episodes include Pat Riley and Shaquille O' Neal.

Stories
2006 American television series debuts